Monastery of John the Evangelist is an active monastery of the Russian Orthodox Church. It is located in the village of Makarovka in the urban district of Saransk. The monastery is situated on the territory of the Makarov churchyard, which has existed since the beginning of the 18th century. It was founded in 1994. There is the residence of the Metropolitan of Saransk and Mordovia.

History 
The monastery is located on land belonging to the boyars Polyansky since the 17th century. Makar Artemyevitch Polanski, who served in Moscow, became master of this land in 1686, moving to Saransk from Moscow. The churchyard was established in Saransk. In 1704, John the Evangelist cathedral was built, later becoming a sanctuary for Polyansky for two years. After the revolution, the churchyard lost all non-essential elements: the wall, the corner towers, Znamenskaya church and Saint Michael the Archangel church. Only the John the Evangelist cathedral and the bell towers remained. Missing features of the churchyard have been restored over time.

The manor-temple ensemble in Makarovka is the most interesting architectural feature of Mordovia.

Architecture

John the Evangelist cathedral 

John the Evangelist Cathedral was built in 1704. Shrines of the cathedral: especially revered icon of Saint John the Evangelist, the arks with particles of the holy relics of the Kiev Pechersk reverend fathers and locally venerated saints of Mordovia.

The Cathedral is one of the oldest surviving buildings in Mordovia.

Bell Tower 
The churchyard in Makarovka is enclosed by a fence. The bell tower, built into the fence, includes the main gates. The bell tower was supposedly built in the 1720s - 1730s. The total height of the bell tower is 36 meters.

External decor is fairly simple and, like the cathedral, has some elements of the XVIIth century.

Saint Michael the Archangel church 

The Winter Church of Michael the Archangel was consecrated in 1702, demolished in 1935 (divine services ceased in 1935, and before destruction, the church was used as a granary). It was restored according to the drawings in the 1970s, housing the museum. It was re-consecrated on November 21, 2002. The men's hospice was attached in 1763 near the church.

Znamenskaya church 
Znamenskaya church was built in the 1800s. Its structure adjoined the fence. In 1930 the church was demolished, but rebuilt in 1970. Since 1991 worship has been conducted there.

Sacred Spring of Saint Nicholas 
The spring's source flows from the hill near St. Nicholas Church, a wooden hilltop building. The springwater is healing and provides silver cations. The spring water tastes soft and fresh. Monks who laboured in the monastery prayed at the holy spring, sanctifying it with their prayers, and thus the water from it healed people of various diseases.

Shrines

Our Lady "The Inexhaustible Chalice" 
The miraculous Icon of the Mother of God "Inexhaustible Chalice" has become a Russian shrine. Mother of God prays to God and her Son to ask for help and support for all sinners. The image of Our Lady "Inexhaustible Chalice" is now in Pokrovsky cathedral of Vysotsky monastery.

Reliquaries 
The relics of the holy fathers of the Kiev Caves are kept in two arks in the monastery.

Makarovskaya hotel 
The hotel of the missionary-pilgrim centre was opened near John the Evangelist cathedral. Located in the new building, it is designed to accommodate 100 people. On the ground floor, there is a refectory with a large hall for 120 people and a small hall for 50 people. The hotel works round the clock.

External links 
 Official site

Buildings and structures in Mordovia
Russian Orthodox monasteries in Russia
Cultural heritage monuments in Mordovia